The 326th Medical Battalion was a divisional support medical unit of the United States Army. It supported the 101st Airborne Division, located at Fort Campbell, Kentucky. Its lineage and honors are perpetuated by the 626th Support Battalion, 101st Airborne Division, Fort Campbell, Kentucky.

Lineage

Constituted 23 July 1918 in the National Army as the 326th Sanitary Train and assigned to the 101st Division
Organized October–November 1918 at Camp Shelby, Mississippi
Disbanded 11 December 1918
Reconstituted 24 June 1921 in the Organized Reserves as the 326th Medical Regiment and assigned to the 101st Division (later redesignated as the 101st Airborne Division)
Organized in November 1921 at Milwaukee, Wisconsin
Reorganized and redesignated 30 January 1942 as the 326th Medical Battalion
Disbanded 15 August 1942;
Concurrently reconstituted in the Army of the United States, and consolidated with the 326th Airborne Medical Company (constituted 6 August 1942 in the Army of the United States and assigned to the 101st Airborne Division) and consolidated unit designated as the 326th Airborne Medical Company, an element of the 101st Airborne Division and activated at Camp Claiborne, Louisiana
Inactivated 30 November 1945 in France
Redesignated 18 June 1948 as Headquarters and Headquarters Company, 501st Airborne Medical Battalion 
Medical Detachment, 907th Glider Field Artillery Battalion [constituted 24 June 1921 in the Organized Reserves as Part, 307th Ammunition Train] redesignated as Clearing Company, 501st Medical Battalion
595th Motor Ambulance Company [constituted 25 February 1943 in the Army of the United States as Company C, 430th Medical Ambulance Battalion] redesignated as Ambulance Company, 501st Airborne Medical Battalion
Battalion allotted 25 June 1948 to the Regular Army
Activated 6 July 1948 at Camp Breckinridge, Kentucky
Inactivated 22 April 1949 at Camp Breckinridge, Kentucky
Activated 25 August 1950 at Camp Breckinridge, Kentucky
Inactivated 1 December 1953 at Camp Breckinridge, Kentucky
Activated 15 May 1954 at Fort Jackson, South Carolina
Headquarters and Headquarters Company, reorganized and redesignated 1 July 1956 as the 326th Airborne Medical Company
Reorganized and redesignated 25 April 1957 as the 326th Medical Company
Clearing and Ambulance companies concurrently inactivated, relieved from assignment to the 101st Airborne Division, and redesignated as the 226th and 595th Medical Companies, respectively — hereafter separate lineages
Reorganized and redesignated 3 February 1964 as Headquarters and Company A, 326th Medical Battalion (organic elements concurrently constituted as elements of the 101st Airborne Division and activated)
Reorganized and redesignated as the 626th Support Battalion in 1994.

Honors

Campaign Participation Credit

World War II
Normandy (with Arrowhead)
Rhineland (with Arrowhead)
Ardennes—Alsace
Central Europe
Vietnam
Counteroffensive, Phase III
Tet Counteroffensive
Counteroffensive, Phase IV
Counteroffensive, Phase V
Counteroffensive, Phase VI
Tet 69/Counteroffensive
Summer—Fall 1969
Winter-Spring 1970
Sanctuary Counteroffensive
Counteroffensive, Phase VII
Consolidation I
Consolidation I
Southwest Asia
Defense of Saudi Arabia
Liberation and Defense of Kuwait

Company C additionally entitled to:

Vietnam:
Defense
Counteroffensive
Counteroffensive, Phase II

Decorations

Presidential Unit Citation (Army), Streamer embroidered NORMANDY
Presidential Unit Citation (Army), Streamer embroidered BASTOGNE
Meritorious Unit Commendation (Army), Streamer embroidered VIETNAM 1968-1969
French Croix de Guerre with Palm, World War II, Streamer embroidered NORMANDY
Netherlands Orange Lanyard
Belgian Fourragere 1940
Cited in the Order of the Day of the Belgian Army for action in FRANCE and BELGIUM
Belgian Croix de Guerre with Palm 1940, Streamer embroidered BASTOGNE
Republic of Vietnam Cross of Gallantry with Palm, Streamer embroidered VIETNAM 1968-1969
Republic of Vietnam Cross of Gallantry with Palm, Streamer embroidered VIETNAM 1971
Republic of Vietnam Civil Action Honor Medal First Class, Streamer embroidered VIETNAM 1968-1970

Company A additionally entitled to:

Republic of Vietnam Cross of Gallantry with Palm, Streamer embroidered VIETNAM 1968
Republic of Vietnam Cross of Gallantry with Palm, Streamer embroidered 1968 — 1969

Company B additionally entitled to:

Presidential Unit Citation (Army), Streamer embroidered DONG AP BIA MOUNTAIN
Meritorious Unit Commendation (Army), Streamer embroidered VIETNAM 1968

History

The 326th Medical Battalion was initially constituted on 23 July 1918 as the 326th Sanitary Train and was assigned to the 101st Division. The 101st Sanitary Train, to include Ambulance Companies 401 through 404 and Field Hospital Companies 401 through 404, was never fully organized before the War Department ordered the demobilization of the 101st Division on 30 November 1918, and the unit was formally demobilized on 11 December 1918.

The 326th Medical Regiment was constituted in the Organized Reserves on 24 June 1921. It was assigned to the 101st Division and allotted to the VI Corps Area. The Regiment was initiated on 17 October 1921 with the regimental headquarters located in Milwaukee, Wisconsin. The regiment's Sanitary Battalion (later redesignated as the Collecting Battalion) was organized  with its headquarters at Holcombe, Wisconsin and its Hospital Battalion was organized with its headquarters at Prairie du Chien, Wisconsin, and its Ambulance Battalion with headquarters at Elroy, Wisconsin. By 1934 the Hospital Battalion and the Collecting Battalion Headquarters relocated to Milwaukee. During most years, the Regiment conducted its annual training at Fort Snelling, Minnesota, hosted by the post's station hospital.

On 30 January 1942, the Regiment was reorganized and redesignated as the 326th Medical Battalion of the 101st Division as part of the Army's reorganization from Square to Triangular divisions. The Army, in preparation for the war in Europe, withdrew the Battalion from the organized reserves and assigned it to the Army of the United States on 15 August 1942, once more reorganizing and redesignating the unit, this time as the 326th Airborne Medical Company. Along with the rest of the division, the company was inactivated on 30 November 1945 at Auxerre, France.

In 1964, just before the division deployed elements to Vietnam, the 326th Medical Company was expanded into the 326th Medical Battalion.

As part of an Army-wide reorganization of combat forces, In 1992 the 326th Medical Battalion was reorganized and redesignated as the 626th Forward Support Battalion. Its companies were redesignated as Forward Support Medical Companies (FSMCs) and reassigned to the Brigade Combat Teams (BCT), 101st Airborne Division (Air Assault). A Company was designated as the Company C, 426 FSB, B Company was designated as Company C, 525 FSB, and C Company remained as the medical company of the 626 FSB.

Vietnam
Stanton's Vietnam Order of Battle, 213, says Co D (Airborne) arrived in Vietnam with the 1st Brigade (separate) at Phan Rang in July 1965. In 1966 the authorized strength of the company was 76. The main body of the 326th Medical Battalion arrived in Vietnam on 22 July 1967 and departed on 23 December 1971. The battalion's authorized strength was 380.

Honduras

Aeromedical evacuation in Desert Shield/Desert Storm
Company D, an Aero Medical Evacuation (Medevac) Unit active until 2015, was often referred to by its callsign, "Eagle Dustoff". It traced its history from the 50th Medical Detachment (Helicopter Ambulance).

On 1 July 1968, the 50th Medical Detachment (Helicopter Ambulance) was attached to the 326th Medical Battalion, was inactivated on 14 August 1968, and its personnel and equipment used to form the nucleus of the Air Ambulance Platoon of the 326th Medical Battalion.

During the 1990 Gulf War (Desert Shield/Desert Storm), Eagle Dustoff (D Co, 326 Med Bn) was deployed to the Saudi Arabian Theatre of operations on Aug 22 1990 and was the first US Army Medevac unit in country.  When Eagle Dustoff landed in Dhahran Saudi Arabia and unloaded the 3 UH60A Medevac birds from the C5A Galaxy, Eagle Dustoff immediately began taking missions with the evacuation of an injured US Marine with a broken leg. Two days after assuming duty, Eagle Dustoff moved 40 miles Northwest of Dhahran to King Fahd International Airport where Medevac operations remained until Jan 18, 1991 when all 12 Medevac birds were moved 700 miles NW to TAA Campbell at the start of Operation Desert Storm.

During the time at TAA Campbell birds from Eagle Dustoff ventured into Iraq to support air operations connected to the Air War against Baghdad.  On February 28, 1991, the remaining personnel from Eagle Dustoff convoyed with the 326 Med Bn and the rest of the 101st Airborne 115 miles into Iraq to FOB Cobra.  Operations at FOB Cobra lasted until after the cease fire with Iraq and for a week after when the unit returned to TAA Campbell.  Eagle Dustoff then completely returned to King Fahd International on Mar 28, 1991.

The last member of Eagle Dustoff to arrive back at Fort Campbell did so on April 24, 1991.

When the 326th Medical Battalion was reorganized and redesignated as the 626th Forward Support Battalion, Company D was redesignated as the 50th Medical Company (Air Ambulance), with the lineage and honors of the original 50th Medical Detachment (Helicopter Ambulance).

Distinctive Unit Insignia

Description
A silver eagle wing entwined by a green serpent with red fangs above a maroon scroll with the motto “ASSURGAM” in silver lettering.  The overall height is 1 1/8 inches (2.86 cm).

Symbolism
The eagle's wing signifies flight.  The serpent represents the Medical Corps, the assignment of the original organization.  The motto translates to “I Rise Up.”

Background
The distinctive unit insignia was originally approved for the 326th Airborne Medical Company on 24 November 1942.  It was amended to place the insignia on a shield with motto below and authorized for the 501st Airborne Medical Battalion on 29 August 1952.  It was rescinded on 29 October 1957.  The original design of the insignia was reinstated with motto added, for the 326th Medical Company on 29 October 1957.  It was redesignated for the 326th Medical Battalion on 5 April 1965.  It was redesignated for the 626th Support Battalion with the description and symbolism revised effective 16 April 1994.

Coat of Arms

Blazon

Shield
Sanguine, a wing Argent entwined with a serpent Vert langued Gules fimbriated of the second.

Crest
From a wreath Argent and Sanguine, two stretchers saltirewise Proper interlaced with an annulet per pale Gules and Azure, the outer edge fimbriated of the first, and charged with a mullet of seven points of the second.

Motto
ASSURGAM (I Rise Up).

Symbolism

Shield
Maroon and white are colors of the Army Medical Service. The design is adapted from the badge of the 326th Airborne Company, from which the Battalion is descended. The wing illustrates the parent organization's airborne function and the serpent represents its medical function.

Crest
The annulet and crossed stretchers refer to the crossroads and the encirclement of Bastogne. Red and blue are adapted from the coat of arms of Bastogne. The seven-pointed star, symbolic of the unit's skill, alludes to the original unit's seven decorations, World War II.

Background
The coat of arms was originally approved for the 501st Airborne Medical Battalion on 29 August 1952.  It was rescinded on 29 October 1957.  It was reinstated and redesignated for the 326th Medical Battalion on 5 April 1965.  The insignia was amended to add a crest on 2 July 1965.  It was redesignated for the 626th Support Battalion with the blazon and symbolism revised effective 16 April 1994.

Background Oval

Although the background oval came from the Institute of Heraldry's "Beret Flash" page, as an Air Assault unit at the time Maroon Berets were authorized for airborne units, the 326th does not appear to have been authorized a beret flash, and none is shown on the Institute of Heraldry's website.

Former Commanders

ORC=Officer's Reserve Corps, a part of the forerunner to the United States Army Reserve

References

Further reading
United States. Annual Historical Report: [326th Medical Battalion]. Fort Campbell, KY: 326th Medical Battalion, 1974. 
Marshall, Phil. Vietnam Diary. Ludlow Falls, Ohio: OS Publ, 2012.  
Columbia River Entertainment Group. Vietnam the air war, 1964–1972. Portland, OR: Columbia River Entertainment Group, a division of Allegro Corporation, 2011.  
McClean, and Plume. Tet 1968 326 Med. Bn., 101st Abn.: an Hour of Vietnam, January 31, 1968. [Fayetteville, Ark.]: Bien Hoa Productions, 1985. 

Medical units and formations of the United States Army
101st Airborne Division
326
Military units and formations established in 1942
Airborne units and formations of the United States Army
Military units and formations of the United States Army in World War II
Military units and formations of the United States Army in the Vietnam War